The MTrain Tour was the second North America headlining concert tour by American singer-songwriter Meghan Trainor to support of her 2015 debut major-label studio album Title. The tour was announced in March 2015, with dates being released at the same time. The show was exclusively promoted by Live Nation Entertainment. The set list featured the majority of the songs from Title. The tour was positively received by critics. The remainder of the tour was canceled on August 11, 2015, because Trainor suffered a vocal cord hemorrhage. As a result, Trainor was able to complete only 13 of the originally scheduled 29 shows.

Background and development
On March 16, 2015, Meghan Trainor announced her second concert tour, MTrain Tour, to support her debut studio album Title (2015). Tour dates were released on the same day, and tickets were released on March 20, 2015. Live Nation Entertainment were announced to be the tour's exclusive promoters, and HP as its sponsor. The set list included fourteen songs from Title along with a cover of Jason Mraz's "I'm Yours" and a dance section featuring LunchMoney Lewis' "Bills".

Synopsis and reception 
Trainor starts the hour-long concert with a performance of "Dear Future Husband", accompanied by her band, two backup singers and two dancers on stage. Trainor performs acoustic version of “Title” and a mashup of her song "3am" and Mraz's song "I'm Yours” with a ukulele and a guitar. These songs are performed on Trainor's ukulele, which gives them a "new, island vibe" according to The Sun Chronicles Jenna Noel. "Walkashame" is then performed. At each concert, Trainor calls a person from the audience on-stage to dance with her in front of the crowd. The person is crowned "king" or "queen" using light-up headbands. "Close Your Eyes" and "Like I'm Gonna Lose You" precede a performance of "Marvin Gaye" for which Charlie Puth joins Trainor.  This is followed by a short dance break to Lewis' song "Bills". Trainor performs her song "Better When I'm Dancin'". The set is finished with "Good to Be Alive" and "All About That Bass" as the encore.

Jackie Frere of Billboard gave the show at the Hollywood Palladium a rating of four out of five stars. She noted that Trainor gave a good performance despite her then recent vocal cord damage, writing "there was little evidence that Trainor hasn't made a nearly full recovery from her hemorrhage". Writing for The Sun Chronicle, Jenna Noel was positive of the show, and stated that she "had her A-game with her", and displayed "enthusiasm and confidence".

 Tour cancellation 
Trainor postponed the tour's first two scheduled dates; July 3, 2015, in Atlantic City and July 4, 2015, in Uncasville due to vocal cord hemorrhage to September 13, 2015, and September 7, 2015, respectively. On July 6, 2015, Trainor announced that her doctors wanted her on "complete vocal rest" until her vocal cords healed; this led to the rescheduling of the Detroit and Chicago dates to September 11, 2015, and September 9, 2015, respectively, as well as the cancellation of Trainor's performance at the Common Ground Music Festival in Lansing. The tour began on July 14, 2015, with the St. Louis show happening as originally planned. On August 11, 2015, Trainor announced on Instagram that she had suffered another vocal cord hemorrhage, thus canceling the remainder of the tour as well as the dates rescheduled for September.

ShowsOfficial boxscore office data'

Canceled shows

Notes

References

External links
 Meghan Trainor's official website

2015 concert tours
Meghan Trainor concert tours